The Raven Explorer II is an American autogyro designed by Raven Rotorcraft of Boulder Colorado and later El Prado, New Mexico, introduced in the 1990s. No longer in production, when it was available the aircraft was supplied as a kit for amateur construction.

Introduced in the mid-1990s the Explorer II design is now out of production as the company is developing into the Raven Rotor-Plane for the light-sport aircraft category.

Design and development
The aircraft was designed to comply with the US Experimental - Amateur-built aircraft rules. It features a single main rotor, a two-seats-in side-by-side configuration open cockpit without a windshield and conventional landing gear.

The aircraft fuselage is made from welded 4130 steel and bolted-together aluminum tubing.

The manufacturer estimated the construction time from the supplied kit as 100 hours.

Operational history
In April 2015 no examples were registered in the United States with the Federal Aviation Administration and it is not clear if any were produced at all.

Specifications (Explorer II)

See also
List of rotorcraft

References

External links

Explorer II
1990s United States sport aircraft
1990s United States ultralight aircraft
1990s United States civil utility aircraft
Homebuilt aircraft
Single-engined tractor autogyros